Bolesław Filipiak (1 September 1901 – 14 October 1978) was a Polish Cardinal of the Roman Catholic Church. He served as Dean of the Roman Rota from 1967 to 1976, and was elevated to the cardinalate in 1976.

Biography
Bolesław Filipiak was born in Ośniszczewko (now in Inowrocław County), Province of Posen, German Empire the oldest of the seven children of Hilarego and Weronika (née Biegałów) Filipiak. He studied at the University of Poznań and the seminary in the same city before being ordained to the priesthood by Bishop Antoni Laubtiza on 29 May 1926. He following a period of pastoral work in Gniezno, Filipiak went to Rome to study at the Pontifical Roman Athenaeum S. Apollinare and the Institute Utriusque Iuris (from where he obtained a doctorate in canon and civil law on 13 April 1935).

From 1935 to 1944 he served as private secretary to Cardinal August Hlond, the primatial Archbishop of Gniezno. Filipiak was jailed in Nazi prisons for a year and then made a member of the archdiocesan tribunal of Gniezno in 1945. He was then president of the tribunal of third instance for matrimonial causes reserved to the Holy See until 1947.

Within the Roman Curia, he was named Auditor (24 September 1947) and later Dean of the Roman Rota (26 June 1967). Filipiak was made an honorary canon of the cathedral chapter of Gniezno on 15 October 1947, and of Poznań on 8 September 1958. He also served as President of the Appellate Tribunal of Vatican City.

On 1 May 1976 Filipiak was appointed Titular Bishop of Plestia by Pope Paul VI. He received his episcopal consecration on the following 14 May from Cardinal Pericle Felici, with Archbishop Antoni Baraniak and Bishop Andrzej Deskur serving as co-consecrators, in the church of Sant'Anselmo all'Aventino. Pope Paul created him Cardinal Deacon of San Giovanni Bosco in Via Tuscolana in the consistory of 24 May 1976. Owing to ill health the Cardinal could not participate in the conclave of August 1978.

Filipiak died in Poznań on the opening day of the October 1978 conclave, at age 77. He is buried in the Cathedral-Basilica of Ss. Peter and Paul.

External links
Cardinals of the Holy Roman Church
Catholic-Hierarchy

1901 births
1978 deaths
People from Inowrocław County
20th-century Polish cardinals
Polish Roman Catholic titular bishops
People from the Province of Posen
Burials at Poznań Cathedral
Cardinals created by Pope Paul VI
Prisoners and detainees of Germany